Honey Creek is a stream in the U.S. state of Ohio.

Honey Creek was for the frequent honeybees there.

See also
List of rivers of Ohio

References

Rivers of Perry County, Ohio
Rivers of Ohio